Kämbla Nature Reserve is a nature reserve which is located in Harju County, Estonia.

The area of the nature reserve is 164 ha.

The protected area was founded in 1991 on the basis of Oti botanical-zoological conservation area. In 1998 the protected area was designated to the nature reserve.

References

Nature reserves in Estonia
Geography of Harju County